Power Rangers Samurai is the eighteenth season of the children's television series Power Rangers, which is based on the Japanese Super Sentai Series. The season was the first to be produced by SCG Power Rangers, after Saban Brands (a successor to the original production company, Saban Entertainment) acquired the franchise. The season marks the franchise's debut on Nickelodeon, premiering on the main network and Nicktoons on February 7, 2011.

Samurai uses props, footage and characteristics from Samurai Sentai Shinkenger and, according to press material, had a "brighter tone and an infusion of fun and comedy that wasn't present in seasons 16 and 17." Samurai is also the first season to be shot and broadcast in HD. Though 2006's Boukenger (which was adapted into Operation Overdrive) was the first Super Sentai series to be shot in HD, preceding Power Rangers seasons were not. Samurai also returns the series to a multi-seasonal format; the second season, titled Power Rangers Super Samurai, began on February 18, 2012 and is officially considered the nineteenth season overall.

Plot
The Samurai Power Rangers–Red Ranger Jayden Shiba, the stoic leader; Blue Ranger Kevin Douglas, the devoted second-in-command; Pink Ranger Mia Watanabe, the big sister; Green Ranger Mike Fernandez, the creative rebel; Yellow Ranger Emily Stewart, the youngest and most innocent; and Gold Ranger Antonio Garcia, the expressive fisherman/tech wiz– fight the evil Master Xandred and his army of Nighloks, who want to flood the planet with the waters of the Sanzu River to bring about the end of civilization.

Promotion
Saban announced they would be enacting an "aggressive" multimedia focus, with planned apps, games, streaming content, and social media content in addition to live shows and a feature film. The run-up to the new series was promoted by 145 Days of Power Rangers, a daily airing of every Mighty Morphin episode in order. An official Power Rangers Facebook page was also created.

On November 24, 2010, the Power Rangers website placed a trailer for the show online, hosted on Yahoo! Kids. The new Samurai Rangers also appeared at the 2010 Macy's Thanksgiving Day Parade.

Paul Schrier has a recurring role in the season, reprising his role as Bulk originating from Mighty Morphin Power Rangers. Jason Narvy subsequently reprised his role as Skull in the final episode.

For the second batch of episodes airing in 2012, Saban began promoting the season with the title of "Super Samurai" to reflect the upgrades to the Rangers powers (glimpsed already in "Clash of the Red Rangers The Movie"). Actor Hector David, Jr., released an official teaser poster for "Super Samurai" on his Facebook profile.

Cast and characters

Rangers
Alex Heartman as Jayden Shiba, the first Red Samurai Ranger.
Erika Fong as Mia Watanabe, the Pink Samurai Ranger.
Hector David Jr. as Mike Fernandez, the Green Samurai Ranger.
Najee De-Tiege as Kevin Douglas, the Blue Samurai Ranger.
Brittany Anne Pirtle as Emily Stewart, the Yellow Samurai Ranger.
Steven Skyler as Antonio Garcia, the Gold Samurai Ranger.
Kimberley Crossman as Lauren Shiba, the second Red Samurai Ranger.

Supporting characters
Rene Naufahu as Mentor Ji
Felix Ryan as Spike Skullovitch
Paul Schrier as Farkas "Bulk" Bulkmeier

Villains
Rick Medina as Deker
Jeff Szusterman as the voices of Master Xandred and Octoroo
Kate Elliott as the voice of Dayu
Derek Judge as the voice of Serrator
Cameron Rhodes as the voice of Professor Cog
Geoff Dolan as the voice of Sergeant Tread 
John Dybvig as the voice of General Gut

Guest stars
Eka Darville as Scott Truman/Ranger Operator Series Red
Jason Narvy as Eugene "Skull" Skullovitch

Episodes

Power Rangers Samurai (Season 18, 2011)

Power Rangers Super Samurai (Season 19, 2012)

Reception
By 2012, Power Rangers had an average of 2 million viewers. The highest rated episode was the May 15, 2011 broadcast of "The Blue and the Gold", with 3.7 million viewers.

Comic book
Papercutz produced two issues of a comic book based on Power Rangers Super Samurai.

The Samurai Rangers also played a role in the 2018 comic Book Event "Shattered Grid", celebrating 25 years of the Power Rangers franchise.

Awards and nominations

Home media
The complete season of Super Samurai was released on Blu-ray on December 4, 2012 and DVD on January 7, 2014 by Lionsgate Home Entertainment.

References

External links

 Official Power Rangers Website
 Power Rangers Samurai at Power Rangers Official Website
 Power Rangers Super Samurai at Power Rangers Official Website
 Power Rangers Samurai at Nickelodeon
 

 
Samurai
2011 American television series debuts
2012 American television series endings
2010s American science fiction television series
2010s Nickelodeon original programming
Japanese mythology in popular culture
Fiction about size change
American children's action television series
American children's adventure television series
American children's fantasy television series
Martial arts television series
Television series created by Haim Saban